Grant County Airport  is a public use airport in Grant County, West Virginia, United States. It is located one nautical mile (2 km) southwest of the central business district of Petersburg, West Virginia, and owned by the Grant County Airport Authority. This airport is included in the National Plan of Integrated Airport Systems for 2011–2015, which categorized it as a general aviation facility.

Facilities and aircraft 
Grant County Airport covers an area of 188 acres (76 ha) at an elevation of 963 feet (294 m) above mean sea level. It has one runway designated 13/31 with an asphalt surface measuring 5,000 by 75 feet (1,524 x 23 m).

For the 12-month period ending December 31, 2009, the airport had 14,000 aircraft operations, an average of 38 per day: 99% general aviation and  1% military. At that time there were 24 aircraft based at this airport: 71% single-engine, 13% multi-engine, 4% helicopter, and 13% glider.

References

External links 
 Aerial image as of October 1990 from USGS The National Map
 
 

Airports in West Virginia
Transportation in Grant County, West Virginia
Buildings and structures in Grant County, West Virginia